ENU (N-ethyl-N-nitrosourea) is a mutagen.

Enu or ENU may also refer to:
 Akanu Ibiam International Airport, serving Enugu, Nigeria
 East north up, a geographical system of Local tangent plane coordinates
 Enu language, a language of China
 L. N. Gumilyov Eurasian National University, in Kazakhstan
 Enu Island, one of the Bissagos Islands
 Enu Island, an island of Indonesia